Zvezda Shipbuilding Complex is a Russian shipbuilding company that operates the country's largest shipyard in the town of Bolshoy Kamen in the Russian Far East. Established in 2015 by a consortium of investors led by the Russian oil company Rosneft, the company has since attracted a large number of orders for oil tankers, LNG carriers and icebreakers.

Description

The main production facilities at Zvezda Shipbuilding Complex, built at and around the site of the old Zvezda Shipyard, include a  graving dock and a horizontal slipway served by a 40,000-tonne floating transfer dock capable of launching  hulls. Both production lines are served by 1200-tonne gantry cranes as well as numerous smaller cranes.

History

At the end of the Cold War, the Zvezda shipyard was used to decommission Soviet nuclear submarines, with funding and support from the US and Canada under the Nunn–Lugar Cooperative Threat Reduction initiative.

Following the decommissioning work, there were plans to expand and redevelop the shipyard to construct larger new ships. Work on the latest attempt at expansion began in 2009; the Russian government has criticised delays and threatened to hand control of the project to third parties, perhaps including Rosneft and Gazprom. In the longer term, the shipyard may be opened up to foreign investors as part of a broader plan to make the Russian shipbuilding industry capable of competing with shipbuilders in other countries.

When the expansion is complete, the shipyard would be able to build ships up to 360m and 250,000dwt.

As of 2017, the Zvezda shipyard has orders for only 14 vessels, mostly from Rosneft, one of the owners.

In the middle of 2018, the shipyard's order book amounted to 118 vessels, including orders from Rosneft for 26 vessels, 4 vessels are in the process of construction. In September 2018, the first tanker of the Aframax class was laid. Also in September, an agreement was signed with Samsung Heavy Industries on the transfer of competencies in the construction of tankers. Zvezda has cooperation with Samho (Hyundai) HI Mokpo DSME Samsung and Hyundai HI .

In September 2020 an order for 10 new large (174,000 cbm capacity) LNG gas tankers was placed with Zvezda shipyard by a joint venture between the Russian companies Novatek and Sovcomflot to serve the future Artic LNG 2 project on the Gyda Peninsula.

List of ships built or on order

See also
 List of shipyards of the Soviet Union

References

Shipyards of Russia
United Shipbuilding Corporation
Shipbuilding companies of the Soviet Union
Companies based in Primorsky Krai